The Doomsday Festival was a two-day music festival held August 19–20, 2000, at the Ostragehege in Dresden, Germany. The event featured a wide range of bands, but is best known as the occasion of Skinny Puppy's reunion concert, which closed the festival and was recorded for the live album Doomsday: Back and Forth Series 5: Live in Dresden (2001). It was Skinny Puppy's first concert since 1992, first in Europe since 1988, and first ever in the former East Germany. The Sisters of Mercy headlined the first day of the festival.

Concert line-up

Day one

 Unheilig
 Illuminate
 Zeromancer
 Letzte Instanz
 De/Vision
 In Extremo
 Phillip Boa & The Voodooclub
 Wolfsheim
 The Sisters of Mercy

Day two
 Accessory
 Philtron
 Velvet Acid Christ
 Terminal Choice
 Covenant
 And One
 Skinny Puppy

External links

Official site (archived)

Festivals in Dresden
Music festivals in Germany
2000 in German music
20th century in Saxony
2000s in Saxony